Michel Dion (born 30 June 1959) is a Canadian former sports shooter. He competed at the 1992 Summer Olympics and the 1996 Summer Olympics.

References

External links
 

1959 births
Living people
Canadian male sport shooters
Olympic shooters of Canada
Shooters at the 1992 Summer Olympics
Shooters at the 1996 Summer Olympics
Sportspeople from Quebec City
Pan American Games medalists in shooting
Pan American Games silver medalists for Canada
Pan American Games bronze medalists for Canada
Shooters at the 1983 Pan American Games
Shooters at the 1995 Pan American Games
Shooters at the 2015 Pan American Games
Medalists at the 1995 Pan American Games
Medalists at the 2015 Pan American Games
Commonwealth Games medallists in shooting
Commonwealth Games gold medallists for Canada
Commonwealth Games silver medallists for Canada
Commonwealth Games bronze medallists for Canada
Shooters at the 1994 Commonwealth Games
21st-century Canadian people
20th-century Canadian people
Medallists at the 1986 Commonwealth Games
Medallists at the 1994 Commonwealth Games
Medallists at the 1998 Commonwealth Games